is a prominent Japanese politician who, until 2009, represented  Democratic Party of Japan as a member of the House of Representatives in the Diet (national legislature).

Iwakuni was born in Osaka and graduated from the University of Tokyo. He worked at Nikko Securities from 1959 to 1977, heading its offices in London, Paris and Beirut, and then at Morgan Stanley from 1977 to 1984. In 1984 he became the CEO of Merrill Lynch Japan, and in 1987 was promoted to a senior executive position at Merrill Lynch Capital Markets in the US.

In 1989, Iwakuni left Merrill Lynch to become mayor of Izumo, Shimane. After running unsuccessfully for the governorship of Tokyo in 1995, he was elected to the House of Representatives for the first time in 1996. He served as the Director-General of the International Department of the Democratic Party of Japan until 2009, when he decided to step down from politics. He has also served as vice president of the DPJ.  Iwakuni now serves as Senior Adviser to GR Japan, a government relations consultancy, and teaches at several universities in Japan, Korea, and the U.S. In 2010 he was appointed as a policy advisor to the Liberal Democratic Party.

References

External links 
 Official website in Japanese

1936 births
Living people
People from Osaka
People from Shimane Prefecture
University of Tokyo alumni
University of Virginia faculty
Japanese businesspeople
Merrill (company) people
Mayors of places in Japan
Tokyo gubernatorial candidates
Members of the House of Representatives (Japan)
Democratic Party of Japan politicians
21st-century Japanese politicians